Scoparia argolina is a moth in the family Crambidae. It was described by Oswald Bertram Lower in 1902. It is found in Australia, where it has been recorded from New South Wales.

References

Moths described in 1902
Scorparia